Wacław Radziwinowicz (1953, Olsztyn) - Polish journalist, 1997-2015 correspondent of Gazeta Wyborcza in Russia. Expelled in December 2015. He has published two books about Russia.

References 

1953 births
Polish reporters and correspondents
Living people
People deported from Russia
Date of birth missing (living people)